Lung receptors sense irritation or inflammation in the bronchi and alveoli.

References

Animal anatomy
Lung